Jeff Curtin (born July 4, 1983 in Oreland, Pennsylvania) is a retired American soccer player, who last played for D.C. United of Major League Soccer.

Jeff played college soccer at Georgetown University, where he finished with 12 goals and 7 assists in 73 matches.  He was named All Big East Second Team for four consecutive years (2002–05). He was drafted in the 2nd round, 14th overall, by the Chicago Fire in the 2006 MLS SuperDraft; he subsequently played 3 times for Fire, scoring one goal, before being claimed in the waiver draft by D.C. United on March 4, 2008.  On May 23, 2008, D.C. United announced that Jeff Curtin was retiring after a sequence of injuries and expected rehabilitation.

He is the younger brother of his former teammate with the Fire, defender Jim Curtin, who later played with Chivas USA.

References

1983 births
Living people
American soccer players
Association football defenders
Chicago Fire FC draft picks
Chicago Fire FC players
D.C. United players
Georgetown Hoyas men's soccer players
Major League Soccer players
People from Springfield Township, Montgomery County, Pennsylvania
Soccer players from Pennsylvania